The term K-class submarine may refer to:

 British K-class submarine
 Norwegian K-class submarine
 United States K-class submarine
 United States K-1-class submarine (1951)
 Soviet K-class submarine

it:Classe K (sommergibile)